Ningthoujam Samananda (born 21 April 1984) is an Indian footballer who plays as a defender for Mumbai Tigers in the I-League.

External links

Indian footballers
1984 births
Living people
I-League players
Sporting Clube de Goa players
Mumbai Tigers FC players
Royal Wahingdoh FC players
Footballers from Manipur
Association football defenders